Vysoká, a feminine form of an adjective meaning high, tall in both Czech and Slovak languages is a common placename:

Czech Republic
Vysoká (Bruntál District), a municipality and village in the Moravian-Silesian Region
Vysoká (Havlíčkův Brod District), a municipality and village in the Vysočina Region
Vysoká (Hostýn-Vsetín Mountains), a peak in the Hostýn-Vsetín Mountains
Vysoká (Mělník District), a municipality and village in the Central Bohemian Region
Vysoká (Svitavy District), a municipality and village in the Pardubice Region
Vysoká Lhota, a municipality and village in the Vysočina Region
Vysoká Libyně, a municipality and village in the Plzeň Region
Vysoká nad Labem, a municipality and village in the Hradec Králové Region
Vysoká Pec (Chomutov District), a municipality and village in the Ústí nad Labem Region
Vysoká Pec (Karlovy Vary District), a municipality and village in the Karlovy Vary Region
Vysoká Srbská, a municipality and village in the Central Bohemian Region
Vysoká u Příbramě, a municipality and village in the Central Bohemian Region

Slovakia
Vysoká, Banská Štiavnica District, a municipality and village in the Banská Bystrica Region
Vysoká, Sabinov District, a municipality and village in the Prešov Region
Vysoká (Carpathian mountain), a peak in the Little Carpathians
Vysoká, a peak in the High Tatras
Vysoká nad Kysucou, a municipality and village in the Žilina Region